David Gregory or Dave Gregory may refer to:

Sciences
 David Gregory (mathematician) (1659–1708), Scottish mathematician and astronomer
 David Gregory (physician) (1625–1720), Scottish physician and inventor

Writers
 David Gregory (author), Christian author
 David Gregory (journalist) (born 1970), American journalist and former host of NBC's Meet the Press
 David Gregory (historian) (1696–1767), English churchman and academic
 David Gregory-Kumar, BBC News journalist

Sports
 Dave Gregory (cricketer) (1845–1919), Australian cricketer
 David Gregory (footballer, born 1951), English footballer
 David Gregory (footballer, born 1970), English footballer
 David Gregory (footballer, born 1994), English football goalkeeper

Other
 Dave Gregory (musician) (born 1952), guitarist for XTC
 David Gregory (Royal Navy officer) (1909–1975), British admiral
 David A. Gregory (born 1985), American TV actor